Emma Kruse Va'ai is a Samoan chief ('high matai'), writer and educator in Samoa. Her matai chief title is Letuimanu’asina. She has a PhD in English from the University of New South Wales in Australia and is a former director of Samoa Polytechnic. Currently, she is the Deputy Vice-Chancellor of the National University of Samoa following the polytechnic's merger into the university in 2006. Also a lecturer in English at the university, she is a strong advocate for bilingual education in both English and the Samoan language.

As a writer, she has published poetry and stories which have been translated into other Pacific Islands languages. She is also an executive committee member of the Samoa Association of Women Graduates (SAWG).

Letuimanu’asina was born and raised in Samoa in a family of eight siblings. Her primary and secondary schooling was at the Marist Missionary Sisters. Later, she studied at Victoria University in New Zealand before undertaking her doctorate in Australia. She was married to judge Alo Vaimoa Va'ai and they have four children.

Publications
1998 Palolo Time, a poem from Samoa; Learning Media, Ministry of Education (NZ), ISBN 0478227086
1998 Ready for School, a story from Samoa; Learning Media, Ministry of Education (NZ), 
2011 Producing the text of culture: the appropriation of English in contemporary Samoa; National University of Samoa (Lepapaigalagala, Samoa),

References

Samoan chiefs
Living people
Samoan women poets
University of New South Wales alumni
Academic staff of the National University of Samoa
20th-century Samoan poets
20th-century women writers
Year of birth missing (living people)